Canipsa pyraliata is a species of snout moth. It was described by Frederic Moore in 1888 and is found in India.

References

Epipaschiinae
Moths described in 1888